Alan Fred Titchmarsh  HonFSE (born 2 May 1949) is an English gardener, broadcaster, TV presenter, poet, and novelist. After working as a professional gardener and a gardening journalist, he established himself as a media personality through appearances on television gardening programmes. He has developed a diverse writing and broadcasting career.

Early career
Alan Fred Titchmarsh was born on 2 May 1949 in Ilkley, West Riding of Yorkshire, England. He is the son of Bessie (née Hardisty), a textile mill worker, and Alan Fred Titchmarsh senior, a plumber. In 1964, after leaving school at 15, with one O-level in Art, Titchmarsh went to work as an apprentice gardener with Ilkley Council, before leaving in 1968, at 18, for Shipley Art and Technology Institute in Shipley in the West Riding of Yorkshire to study for a City and Guilds in horticulture.

Titchmarsh went on to study at Hertfordshire College of Agriculture and Horticulture for the National Certificate in Horticulture, before finally moving to the Royal Botanic Gardens, Kew to study for a Diploma in Horticulture. After graduating he stayed on at Kew, employed as a supervisor and later as a staff trainer. He left to pursue a career in gardening journalism in 1974. His interest in English literature and writing prompted him to apply for a job as assistant editor of gardening books at Hamlyn Publishing and he began to write gardening books of his own, publishing his first in 1976.

Television

Titchmarsh's first few television appearances were on the long-running BBC television show Nationwide as a horticulture expert. This led to his being invited to present coverage of the Chelsea Flower Show for BBC television in 1983. Titchmarsh hosted this every year until 2013. He also appeared on other BBC shows, such as Breakfast Time and Open Air as either a guest presenter or as a gardening expert.

In 1991, Titchmarsh was brought in to host the long-running BBC television talk show Pebble Mill, which he did until its cancellation in 1996. In 1991, he presented a 6-part series in which he followed in the footsteps of the pilgrims, travelling around Britain and Ireland in the process.

In 1996, Titchmarsh took over as host of another long-running BBC series, Gardeners' World, the show being filmed in his own garden. In 1997, he took gardening to the masses with BBC One television series, Ground Force, in which he and fellow presenters Charlie Dimmock and Tommy Walsh would perform a makeover on a garden. The show has travelled as far as the United States and South Africa, where one episode saw the Ground Force team make over Nelson Mandela's garden.

Staying involved in gardening programmes after Gardeners' World, Titchmarsh has presented two series of How To Be A Gardener.

Away from gardening, Titchmarsh has had spells presenting Songs of Praise and a series of programmes on BBC Radio 2 in which he played a selection of light classical music, as well as a BBC nature documentary series, British Isles - A Natural History. In recent years, he has done less television and radio and spent more time on his career as a novelist and renewed interest in writing gardening books.

Titchmarsh has appeared in an advertisement for the Yorkshire Tourist Board (now Welcome To Yorkshire) as part as of a series which included contributions from other Yorkshire-born celebrities including Brian Blessed, Melanie Brown, Darren Gough and Brian Turner. He occasionally does other voiceover work for advertisements as well as voicing the title character in Gordon the Garden Gnome, a cartoon series for the CBeebies channel. In autumn 2007, Titchmarsh hosted a follow-up series to British Isles – A Natural History entitled The Nature of Britain focusing on British plant and animal species.

Other work includes hosting a 2005 special edition of the Antiques Roadshow, entitled the 20th Century Roadshow, which focused on modern collectibles, performing in the 2006 Children's Party at the Palace for the Queen's 80th birthday, and guest hosting an episode of The Paul O'Grady Show while O'Grady was off for medical reasons.

In 2007 Titchmarsh hosted The Great British Village Show, in which gardeners and cooks from all over Britain competed to be the best at growing pumpkins, runner beans and tomatoes, and at knitting, baking cakes and making jam. In September 2007 Titchmarsh began presenting his afternoon ITV chat show The Alan Titchmarsh Show which aired in the 3.00 pm afternoon slot. The show ended in November 2014.

In 2010 Titchmarsh presented the first series of Popstar to Operastar with Myleene Klass. Since 2011, he has presented gardening show Love Your Garden.

On 1 June 2012 he presented Elizabeth: Queen, Wife, Mother on ITV and was criticised the following day, for his obsequiousness, in a review by Sam Wollaston for The Guardian.

In 2013, Titchmarsh, then aged 64, responded to complaints that older women were discriminated against on television by stating he would like to hear less "whingeing". "They don't complain in their early days when they are disporting themselves on sports cars", he stated in an interview with The Observer. This drew criticism from media figures who had been protesting against the difficulties faced by older women in the media, including from Miriam O'Reilly, winner of an age discrimination case against the BBC.

In spring 2013 Titchmarsh was a reporter on BBC Two programme The Great British Winter. In December 2014 Titchmarsh presented a two-part series for ITV called The Queen's Garden that was filmed over a time period of one year.

In January 2015 Titchmarsh presented Britain's Best Back Gardens. In February 2016, Titchmarsh began presenting the daytime game show Masterpiece for ITV.

In February 2017, the Channel Five programme Secrets of the National Trust started airing with Alan Titchmarsh as the main presenter alongside other well known celebrities.

Radio
In 1988 Titchmarsh was offered a slot on BBC Radio 2 hosting a gardening show with Gloria Hunniford called House in a Garden.

In January 2006, Titchmarsh was given a permanent slot on BBC Radio 2 on Sunday evenings with the show "Melodies for you" consisting of light classical and popular music, following the traditional style of Sunday-night broadcasting on Radio 2. In August 2011, Titchmarsh left Radio 2. Since January 2012, he has hosted a Saturday morning show on Classic FM.

Writing
His first novel, Only Dad, was published in November 2001. A further six books have since been published. Running parallel to the fiction work, Titchmarsh published a new series of gardening guides, the How to Garden series, in April 2009. His second autobiographical work is Nobbut A Lad: A Yorkshire Childhood from October 2006, a follow-up to his first autobiography, Trowel & Error, published in 2002. When I Was A Nipper was published on 30 September 2010.

Personal life
Titchmarsh has been married to Alison since 1975 and they have two children.

In addition to his extensive television and writing work, Titchmarsh is also trustee of a charity, 'Gardens for Schools', and others, including 'Seeds for Africa'. Gardens for Schools helped fund gardens and green spaces in and around schools, while Seeds for Africa encourages sustainable vegetable gardening. It provides community groups with the tools, seeds and training they need to start their own vegetable gardens including providing water installation and preparing the land. Gardens for Schools has since been merged with the RHS Campaign for School Gardening. Away from horticulture, Titchmarsh has been involved with the Cowes inshore lifeboat, where he was patron until 2008, and with the National Maritime Museum, where he was a trustee until December 2008.

In 2004 Titchmarsh became the president of Perennial, officially known as the Gardeners' Royal Benevolent Society. Perennial is one of the UK's oldest charities and was created in 1839 to help gardeners and horticulturists facing times of difficulty.

In 2010 Titchmarsh became president of the plant conservation charity Plant Heritage (previously the NCCPG).

Titchmarsh has a wax statue at Madame Tussaud's.

In August 2014 Titchmarsh was one of 200 public figures who were signatories to a letter to The Guardian expressing their hope that Scotland would vote to remain part of the United Kingdom in September's referendum on that issue. Titchmarsh is a monarchist.

Titchmarsh is an occasional practitioner of church bellringing. In 2011 he rang a quarter peal in Holybourne, Hampshire, to celebrate the marriage of Prince William and Catherine Middleton.

In 2011 he participated in an Elm Tree Planting Ceremony to promote urban greening in London.  He returned to the Marylebone and Fitzrovia area to plant a project's 1000th new tree in 2022.

Titchmarsh moved to his home, a grade II listed Georgian farmhouse in Hampshire, in 2002. He also has a coastal home, near Cowes on the Isle of Wight, where he spends about a third of the year.

Honours and awards
Titchmarsh was appointed a Member of the Order of the British Empire (MBE) in the 2000 New Year Honours for services to horticulture and broadcasting. He was made a Deputy Lieutenant (DL) of the County of Hampshire in 2001. In 2008, Titchmarsh served as High Sheriff of the Isle of Wight.

In 1999, Titchmarsh was awarded an honorary Doctor of Science (DSc) degree by the University of Bradford. He was made Patron at Writtle College, a university college in Essex, in 2001 and had a building named after him at the college in 2011 (the 'Titchmarsh Centre for Animal Studies'). In 2004, he was awarded the Royal Horticultural Society's Victoria Medal of Honour, the highest award the RHS can bestow. In 2007, he was awarded an honorary degree by the University of Winchester, and in 2014 was designated as the Chancellor of the university. He was honoured by the City of Westminster at a tree planting and plaque ceremony in 2011 and 2022.

Other projects
Titchmarsh has launched his own range of gardening tools, developed in conjunction with manufacturer Bulldog Tools. He has worked with Digitalis Media to launch "Gardeners' Heaven", the online retail arm of his website, which supplies his tools as well as other popular gardening products.

Titchmarsh played the Pope in Sister Act: The Musical at the Minack Theatre, Porthcurno, Cornwall in the BROS Theatre Company Production on 29 May 2019. He appeared in the final act of the show.

Bibliography

Non-fiction
 Alan Titchmarsh – The Gardener's Year, 2005
 Alan Titchmarsh's Fill My Stocking, 2005
 The Complete How to Be a Gardener, 2005
 British Isles, 2005
 England, Our England, 2007
 Nature of Britain, 2007
 The Kitchen Gardener – Grow Your Own Fruit & Veg, 2008
 How to Garden: Gardening in the Shade, 2009
 How to Garden: Vegetables and Herbs, 2009
 How to Garden: Container Gardening, 2009
 How to Garden: Garden Design, 2009
 How to Garden: Lawns, Paths and Patios, 2009
 How to Garden: Pruning and Training, 2009
 How to Garden: Growing Fruit, 2010
 How to Garden: Flowering Shrubs, 2010
 How to Garden: Climbers and Wall Shrubs, 2010
 How to Garden: Greenhouse Gardening, 2010
 How to Garden: Perennial Garden Plants, 2010
 Elizabeth: Her Life, Our Times, Ebury Press 2012
 The Queen's Houses, BBC Books 2014
 Lost Skills and Crafts Handbook: A Guide to the Old Ways of Country Life Hardcover, BBC Books 2021

Memoirs
 Trowel and Error, Hodder & Stoughton 2002
 Nobbut A Lad : A Yorkshire Childhood, Hodder & Stoughton 2006
 Knave of Spades, Hodder & Stoughton 2009
 Collected memoirs, Hodder & Stoughton 2016 

Fiction
 Mr MacGregor, Simon & Schuster 1998
 The Last Lighthouse Keeper, Simon & Schuster 1999
 Animal Instincts, Simon & Schuster 2000
 Only Dad, Simon & Schuster 2001
 Rosie, Simon & Schuster
 Love and Dr. Devon, Simon & Schuster
 Folly, Hodder & Stoughton 2008
 The Haunting, Hodder & Stoughton 2011
 Bring Me Home, Hodder & Stoughton 2014
 Mr Gandy's Grand Tour, Hodder & Stoughton 2016
 The Scarlet Nightingale, Hodder Paperbacks 2019

Poetry
 Marigolds, Myrtle and Moles: A Gardener's Bedside Book'', Hodder & Stoughton 2020 {)

Filmography

References

External links

BBC Nature Presenter Biography

Alan Titchmarsh on Classic FM

1949 births
Living people
21st-century English male writers
21st-century English novelists
BBC Radio 2 presenters
British monarchists
Country Life (magazine) people
Deputy Lieutenants of Hampshire
English Christians
English garden writers
English gardeners
English male non-fiction writers
English male novelists
English television presenters
English television talk show hosts
High Sheriffs of the Isle of Wight
Members of the Order of the British Empire
People from Ilkley
Television personalities from West Yorkshire
Victoria Medal of Honour recipients